Waduge Suranga Thushara Fernando (born 18 September 1982) is a former Sri Lankan cricketer who has played in eight first class matches and in nine List A matches.

External links 
 

1982 births
Living people
Panadura Sports Club cricketers
Moratuwa Sports Club cricketers
Sri Lankan cricketers